The 1997 season in Swedish football, starting January 1997 and ending December 1997:

Honours

Official titles

Competitions

Promotions, relegations and qualifications

Promotions

Relegations

International qualifications

Domestic results

Allsvenskan 1997

Allsvenskan qualification play-off 1997

Division 1 Norra 1997

Division 1 Södra 1997

Division 1 qualification play-off 1997 
1st round

2nd round

Svenska Cupen 1996–97 
Final

National team results

Notes

References 
Print

Online

 
Seasons in Swedish football